Landgravine Auguste Fredericka of Hesse-Homburg (full German name: Auguste Friederike, Landgräfin von Hessen-Homburg; 28 November 1776, Bad Homburg vor der Höhe, Landgraviate of Hesse-Homburg, Holy Roman Empire – 1 April 1871, Ludwigslust, Grand Duchy of Mecklenburg-Schwerin), was a member of the House of Hesse and a Landgravine of Hesse-Homburg by birth. Through her marriage she was also a member of the House of Mecklenburg and Hereditary Grand Duchess of Mecklenburg-Schwerin.

She was the sixth child and fourth daughter of Frederick V, Landgrave of Hesse-Homburg and his wife Landgravine Caroline of Hesse-Darmstadt, in turn daughter of Louis IX, Landgrave of Hesse-Darmstadt.

Life

Because all her older sisters married very early, by 1793 Auguste became in the primary caretaker of her ailing father.

In Homburg on 3 April 1818, the 41-years-old Auguste married Frederick Louis, Hereditary Grand Duke of Mecklenburg-Schwerin, twice a widower and father of four surviving children. The marriage was suggested by the late second wife of the Hereditary Grand Duke, Princess Caroline Louise of Saxe-Weimar-Eisenach (Auguste's first-cousin) at her deathbed.

The union was childless and lasted only 18 months until Frederick Louis' death on 29 November 1819. She was a devoted stepmother for her husband's children, taking responsibility for their upbringing and education. She developed a particularly close relationship with her stepdaughter Helene, eldest child and only daughter of her cousin Caroline Louise.

Auguste, who never remarried, remained in Mecklenburg-Schwerin for the rest of her life, dying in Ludwigslust aged 94. She was buried at the Helena Paulovna Mausoleum, next to her husband and his two previous wives.

Ancestry

Notes

Bibliography

Paule Marquise d’Harcourt: Die Herzogin von Orleáns Helene von Mecklenburg-Schwerin p. 10.
 Karl Schwartz: Landgraf Friedrich V. von Hessen-Homburg und seine Familie. Archives and family documents, Rudolstadt 1878.

External links 

Books about Auguste Friederike of Hesse-Homburg in: Landesbibliographie Mecklenburg-Vorpommern
Auguste Friederike, Prinzessin von Hessen-Homburg in: zeno.org

1776 births
1871 deaths
House of Hesse-Homburg
House of Mecklenburg
Landgravines of Germany
People from Bad Homburg vor der Höhe
Daughters of monarchs